Meilan is one district in Haikou City, Hainan, China.

Administrative regions

Meilan district has jurisdiction over places within Haikou city, such as Haifu Road, Bo'ai Road area, Haidian Road, Renminlu Road, Bailong Road, Hepingnan Road, and Baisha Road.  It also contains the small towns of Xinbu Island, Meilan District, Lingshan, Yanfeng, Shanjiang, Dazhipo, as well as the villages on Beigang Island.

See also
 Haikou Meilan International Airport

External links
Meilan District People's Congress (Chinese)

Populated places in Hainan
Haikou